Dual Survival is a United States reality television series that airs on the Discovery Channel. The show features a pair of survival experts in predetermined survival scenarios while in challenging environments.

For the first two seasons, the show featured the differing outdoor survival philosophies and skills of Cody Lundin, a naturalist and primitive-skills expert who runs the Aboriginal Living Skills School in Prescott, Arizona, and Dave Canterbury, a military-trained survival instructor who runs the Pathfinder Training School in Ohio. Beginning with the third season, Canterbury was replaced with Joseph "Joe" Teti, and in Season 4, Matt Graham replaced Lundin; Teti and Graham remained with the show through Season 6. Season 7 features Grady Powell, an ex-U.S. Army Green Beret, who replaced Joseph Teti, and Bill McConnell, a wilderness survivalist, who replaced Matt Graham. Season 8 Bill McConnell is replaced by Josh James for all but the last 2 episodes of the season where Josh James is replaced by Airforce veteran Bo Mcglone. In Season 9 both Grady and Bo are replaced by Naked and Afraid stars E.J. and Jeff.

Episodes

Production

Season 1 and Season 2 of Dual Survival originally aired in 2010 and 2011, respectively.

Season 3 commenced production in 2012 and began airing on January 1, 2013.

Season 4 debuted on April 23, 2014, and Season 5 began airing on January 21, 2015.

Season 6 aired its first episode on September 30, 2015.

Season 7 aired its first episode on January 13, 2016.

Season 8 aired its first episode on June 15, 2016, featuring Grady Powell and new partner Joshua James. Joshua is from New Zealand and has a high profile in the survival world.

Season 9 aired its first episode on August 24, 2016, featuring new hosts Edwin John Snyder and Jeffrey Zausch.

Format
In Dual Survival's first two seasons, each episode featured Lundin and Canterbury in a different survival scenario: marooned on a deserted island, lost in a foreboding jungle, stranded in an arid desert, etc. They had to survive for a number of days with minimal gear that pertained to the scenario. Along the way, Lundin and Canterbury demonstrated various survival skills such as using primitive methods to make fire, obtaining potable water, and hunting, foraging, or gathering food.

Conflict often arose from differences between the actors philosophies and methods. For example, Canterbury often remarked on Lundin's choice to not wear shoes or long pants, regardless of the scenario's environment, such as glaciers.

In Season 3, Joseph Teti replaced Dave Canterbury, and in February 2014, prior to the start of Season 4, Cody Lundin announced via Facebook that he was fired by Discovery Channel owing to what he alleges were “differences over safety and health concerns.” Early in Season 4, Matt Graham replaced Cody Lundin as Teti's partner.

International broadcasters
The series premiered in Australia on April 7, 2015 on Discovery Channel.

Spin off
A Brazilian version of Dual Survivor started filming in 2012 and was titled Dual Survival Brazil (pt). It was produced by Mixer and aired for two seasons. The survival experts on this show are Edmilson Leite, a colonel in the Brazilian Air Force, and Leonardo Rocha, who has lived with indigenous tribes and is a primitive skills specialist.

DVD releases

See also
Robinsonade

References

External links

2010 American television series debuts
2010s American documentary television series
Discovery Channel original programming
Works about survival skills
English-language television shows
2016 American television series endings